HD 69863 is a binary star system in the southern constellation of Carina. It is visible to the naked eye as a dim point of light with a combined apparent visual magnitude of 5.16. The system is located at a distance of about255 light years from the Sun based on parallax. The dual nature of this system was announced in 1832 by German astronomer Carl Rümker. As of 2015, the pair had an angular separation of  along a position angle of 70°.

The brighter primary, designated component A, has a visual magnitude of 5.27 and is an A-type main-sequence star with a stellar classification of A2V. It is 635 million years old and is spinning with a projected rotational velocity of 191 km/s. The star has 2.1 times the mass of the Sun.

The magnitude 7.62 companion, component B, is a F-type main-sequence star with a class of F2V.  It is radiating four times the luminosity of the Sun from its photosphere at an effective temperature of 6,806 K. The system is a source for X-ray emission, which is most likely coming from the secondary.

References

A-type main-sequence stars
F-type main-sequence stars
Binary stars

Carina (constellation)
Carinae, C
Durchmusterung objects
069863
040429
3260